Tarano is a  (municipality) in the Province of Rieti in the Italian region of Latium, located about  north of Rome and about  west of Rieti.

Tarano borders the municipalities of Collevecchio, Forano, Montebuono, Selci, Stimigliano, and Torri in Sabina.

Demographic evolution

References

Cities and towns in Lazio